Ariston was a comic actor, who in 324 BC performed at the Susa weddings arranged by Alexander the Great to unify Greek and Persian cultures.

References
Who's who in the age of Alexander the Great (Ariston [4]), 

Actors of Alexander the Great
4th-century BC Greek people
Place of birth unknown